Üçoluk may refer to the following places in Turkey:

 Üçoluk, Gülnar
 Üçoluk, Konyaaltı
 Üçoluk, Sungurlu